Gideon Gerhardus Helberg is a South African rugby union player who most recently played for the  in the Currie Cup and Vodacom Cup. His usual position is wing.

In 2011 it was revealed that he was involved in an affair with his girlfriend's mother, which led to a fake death photo of Helberg being supplied. The mother pleaded guilty to "enticement to commit assault with intent to do grievous bodily harm" and was given a suspended three-year jail sentence in November 2011.

References

Living people
1989 births
South African rugby union players
Blue Bulls players
Bulls (rugby union) players
Golden Lions players
South Africa international rugby sevens players